The title His Holiness or Her Holiness (and the associated form of address Your Holiness) is an official title or style referring to leaders in a number of religious traditions. It is used to refer to the pope in Catholicism; this use can be traced back several hundred years. It is also an official title for Oriental Orthodox patriarchs or Catholicoi. It is used to refer to religious leaders in Islam, Buddhism, and Bon. Buddhist leaders referred to this way include Lu Sheng-yen, the Dalai Lama, the Menri Trizin, and Da'i al-Mutlaq of the Dawoodi Bohras, among others.

Buddhism and Bon
The English-language honorific "His Holiness" and the female version "Her Holiness" have commonly and very recently been used for religious leaders from other traditions, including Buddhist
 leaders such as Lu Sheng-Yen, the Dalai Lama, the Gyalwa Karmapa, the Je Khenpo in Bhutan and Shinso Ito of the Shinnyo-en branch of Shingon Buddhism. In the Bön tradition it is used for the Menri Trizin.

Christianity

Catholic Church 

His Holiness is the official style used to address the Roman Catholic pope.

The full papal title, rarely used, is:

 His Holiness (Francis), Bishop of Rome, Vicar of Jesus Christ, Successor of the Prince of the Apostles, Supreme Pontiff of the Universal Church, Primate of Italy, Archbishop and Metropolitan of the Roman Province, Sovereign of the Vatican City State, Servant of the servants of God.

The best-known title, that of "Pope", does not appear in the official list of titles, but is commonly used in the titles of documents and appears, in abbreviated form, in their signatures as "PP", standing for Papa (Pope). The 2020 Annuario Pontificio lists all of his formal titles, except Bishop of Rome, as "historical titles".

It is customary when referring to popes to translate the regnal name into local languages. Thus he is Papa Franciscus in Latin (the official language of the Holy See), Papa Francesco in Italian (the language of the Vatican), Papa Francisco in his native Spanish, and Pope Francis in English.

In February 2013, the Holy See announced that former Pope Benedict XVI would retain the style "His Holiness" after resigning and becoming pope emeritus.
 
The term is sometimes abbreviated as "HH" or "H.H." when confusion with "His/Her Highness" is unlikely.

Oriental and Eastern Orthodox churches
His Holiness is the official style also used to address the Oriental Orthodox Catholicoi/patriarchs. In the Eastern Orthodox Church, the ecumenical patriarch of Constantinople has the title of His All Holiness (abbreviation HAH). It is also used for certain other Eastern patriarchs, notably those who head a church or rite which recognizes neither Rome's nor Constantinople's primacy.

Islam 
In Islam it is used in Ahmadiyya Sunni for the Fifth Caliph Mirza Masroor Ahmad. It is used in the Dawoodi Bohra sect of Ismaili Shia for the office of Da'i al-Mutlaq, Syedna. Syedna Mufaddal Saifuddin is recognized by most Dawoodi Bohras as the 53rd Da'i al-Mutlaq.

See also
 Honorifics
 English honorifics
 Honorifics (linguistics)
 Papal titles

References 

Ecclesiastical styles
Papal titles
Royal styles
Religious honorifics